Bjørn Espen Stokstad (born 13 April 1940 in Oslo, Norway) is a Norwegian jazz clarinettist and architect, married to visual artist Anne Weiglin.

Biography 
From the 1960s, Stokstad was considered one of the leading clarinetist of traditional style in Norway. He started his own orchestra in 1962, and was 1964-85 together with Tore Jensen, leading Stokstad/Jensen Tradband, including trombonist Kjell Haugen, banjoist and singer Børre Frydenlund, bassist Svein Gusrud, and drummer Kjetil Lønborg Jensen. The two friends was also front figures in the tradjazz band Norske Rytmekonger 1985-94. Stokstad/Jensen Trad. Band was a concept within Norwegian traditional jazz in the 1960s, 1970s and 1980s. They were regular performers at a series of national and international festivals like Moldejazz and Nattjazz as well as in New Orleans.

Honors 
 1974: Spellemannprisen in the Jazz category, with Stokstad / Jensen Trad.Band for the album Mer Glajazz

Discography 

 With Stokstad / Jensen Trad.Band
 1972: Happy Jazz (Karussell)
 1973: Glajazz (RCA), with Laila Dalseth
 1974: Mer Glajazz (RCA), with Bill Davison and Laila Dalseth
 1975: Nye Gamle (RCA)
 1977: Blanda Drops (Glajazz Fra Bach Til Beatles) (RCA International)
 1979: Selvskrevet (RCA Victor)
 1982: Kraftjazz (Talent)
 1983: Happy New Chair (Hot Club Records) with Christiania Jazzband
 2000: The Originals - 1974 (Herman Records), featuring Wild Bill Davison & Laila Dalseth

 With Geirr Lystrup
 1979:  I Menneskenes Land (Plateselskapet Mai)

 With Norske Rytmekonger
 1986:  Hot & Blue (NRK, Herman Records), Oliver / Morton / Armstrong / Etc / 1923-28
 1988:  Siemens Spesial: My Heart (Herman Records)

References 

1940 births
Living people
Norwegian jazz clarinetists
Norwegian architects
Spellemannprisen winners
21st-century clarinetists
Architects from Oslo